Encadenado is a 1940 Argentine film. It was filmed in Buenos Aires, Federal District, Argentina and directed by Enrique de Rosas.

Cast
 Alita Román as Elena
 Enrique de Rosas as Leandro Lozano
 Ernesto Raquén as Pablo Lozano
 Homero Cárpena as Martín 
 Alberto Terrones as Don Pietro 
 Amalia Bernabé as Adelaida 
 Pascual Pelliciota as Ferrer
 Alberto De Salvio as Marcial
 José Tresenza as Rogelio
 Pedro Aleandro as Carlos
 Elena Marcó as Lara

External links
 

1940 films
1940s Spanish-language films
Argentine black-and-white films
1940 drama films
Films shot in Buenos Aires
Argentine drama films
1940s Argentine films